The 1994–95 NBA season was the Pacers' 19th season in the National Basketball Association, and 28th season as a franchise. After appearing in their first Conference Finals, the Pacers improved their fortunes by acquiring point guard Mark Jackson from the Los Angeles Clippers, and signing free agent Duane Ferrell during the off-season. The Pacers got off to a solid 14–6 start, then went on a 7-game winning streak in February. After holding a 27–19 record at the All-Star break, the team went 25–11 for the remainder of the season, as they won their first Division title since joining the NBA. The Pacers finished the season first place in the Central Division with a 52–30 record.

Reggie Miller led the team with 19.6 points per game and 195 three-point field goals, and was named to the All-NBA Third Team, and selected for the 1995 NBA All-Star Game, which was his first All-Star appearance since 1990, while Rik Smits had a career year as he averaged 17.9 points and 7.7 rebounds per game. In addition, Derrick McKey provided the team with 13.3 points, 4.9 rebounds and 1.5 steals per game, and was named to the NBA All-Defensive Second Team, while Dale Davis provided with 10.6 points, 9.4 rebounds and 1.6 blocks per game, sixth man Byron Scott contributed 10.0 points per game off the bench, and Jackson averaged 7.6 points, 7.5 assists and 1.3 steals per game. Second-year forward Antonio Davis only played just 44 games due to a back injury, averaging 7.6 points and 6.4 rebounds per game off the bench.

In the playoffs, the Pacers faced off against the Atlanta Hawks for the second consecutive season. The Pacers swept the Hawks in three straight games in the Eastern Conference First Round. As they advanced to the Eastern Conference Semi-finals, the Pacers found themselves in a rematch with New York Knicks. As the Knicks had a better regular season record, the series started in New York. In Game 1, the Pacers were down 6 points with 16.4 seconds left. Miller would single-handedly stun the Knicks by nailing a 3-pointer and then stealing the inbounds pass and tying the game with another 3-pointer. Knicks fan and film director Spike Lee was just a few feet away. Miller would add 2 free throws and give the Pacers a legendary comeback win. The Pacers lost Game 2 and the series returned to Indiana. After four games, the Pacers took a 3–1 series lead. The Knicks would bounce back and force a 7th game at Madison Square Garden. The Pacers would emerge victorious with a 97–95 win, as Patrick Ewing's last-second shot did not go in the basket.

With a 2-point win, the Pacers qualified for the Eastern Conference Finals for the second consecutive season. The Pacers were very familiar with their opponents. Like their first and second round opponents, the Pacers played the Orlando Magic the previous postseason. The Pacers pushed a strong Orlando team to a 7th game before losing the series. The home team would win every game in the series. The Magic would go on to reach the NBA Finals for the first time, but would lose in four straight games to the 6th-seeded Houston Rockets.

Following the season, Scott left in the 1995 NBA Expansion Draft, while long-time Pacers guard Vern Fleming signed as a free agent with the New Jersey Nets, Sam Mitchell re-signed with his former team, the Minnesota Timberwolves, and LaSalle Thompson was released to free agency.

Offseason

NBA Draft

Roster

Roster Notes
 Point guard Damon Bailey missed the entire season due to knee injuries, and never played for the Pacers.
 Center Scott Haskin missed the entire season due to a back injury.

Regular season

Season standings

Record vs. opponents

Game log

Regular season

|- align="center" bgcolor="#ccffcc"
| 1
| November 4, 1994
| @ Atlanta
| W 94–92
|
|
|
| The Omni
| 1–0
|- align="center" bgcolor="#ccffcc"
| 2
| November 5, 1994
| Boston
| W 112–103
|
|
|
| Market Square Arena
| 2–0
|- align="center" bgcolor="#ffcccc"
| 3
| November 9, 19946:00p.m. EST
| Houston
| L 104–109
| Miller (25)
| D. Davis (14)
| Jackson (9)
| Market Square Arena15,258
| 2–1
|- align="center" bgcolor="#ffcccc"
| 4
| November 10, 1994
| @ Detroit
| L 110–112
|
|
|
| The Palace of Auburn Hills
| 2–2
|- align="center" bgcolor="#ccffcc"
| 5
| November 12, 1994
| @ Cleveland
| W 93–86
|
|
|
| Gund Arena
| 3–2
|- align="center" bgcolor="#ffcccc"
| 6
| November 15, 1994
| @ Milwaukee
| L 81–82
|
|
|
| Bradley Center
| 3–3
|- align="center" bgcolor="#ccffcc"
| 7
| November 18, 1994
| Seattle
| W 94–87
|
|
|
| Market Square Arena
| 4–3
|- align="center" bgcolor="#ccffcc"
| 8
| November 19, 1994
| @ Charlotte
| W 102–89
|
|
|
| Charlotte Coliseum
| 5–3
|- align="center" bgcolor="#ccffcc"
| 9
| November 24, 1994
| Golden State
| W 123–96
|
|
|
| Market Square Arena
| 6–3
|- align="center" bgcolor="#ccffcc"
| 10
| November 25, 1994
| Milwaukee
| W 111–106
|
|
|
| Market Square Arena
| 7–3
|- align="center" bgcolor="#ffcccc"
| 11
| November 27, 1994
| @ Portland
| L 89–99
|
|
|
| Memorial Coliseum
| 7–4
|- align="center" bgcolor="#ffcccc"
| 12
| November 28, 1994
| @ Seattle
| L 99–118
|
|
|
| Tacoma Dome
| 7–5

|- align="center" bgcolor="#ccffcc"
| 13
| December 1, 1994
| @ L.A. Clippers
| W 93–84
|
|
|
| Los Angeles Memorial Sports Arena
| 8–5
|- align="center" bgcolor="#ccffcc"
| 14
| December 3, 1994
| @ Golden State
| W 118–107
|
|
|
| Oakland-Alameda County Coliseum Arena
| 9–5
|- align="center" bgcolor="#ccffcc"
| 15
| December 6, 1994
| Detroit
| W 90–83
|
|
|
| Market Square Arena
| 10–5
|- align="center" bgcolor="#ccffcc"
| 16
| December 9, 1994
| @ Philadelphia
| W 94–88
|
|
|
| CoreStates Spectrum
| 11–5
|- align="center" bgcolor="#ccffcc"
| 17
| December 10, 1994
| Miami
| W 117–103
|
|
|
| Market Square Arena
| 12–5
|- align="center" bgcolor="#ffcccc"
| 18
| December 13, 1994
| @ Cleveland
| L 83–90
|
|
|
| Gund Arena
| 12–6
|- align="center" bgcolor="#ccffcc"
| 19
| December 14, 1994
| Atlanta
| W 81–79
|
|
|
| Market Square Arena
| 13–6
|- align="center" bgcolor="#ccffcc"
| 20
| December 16, 1994
| Charlotte
| W 93–91
|
|
|
| Market Square Arena
| 14–6
|- align="center" bgcolor="#ffcccc"
| 21
| December 20, 1994
| @ Charlotte
| L 95–99
|
|
|
| Charlotte Coliseum
| 14–7
|- align="center" bgcolor="#ccffcc"
| 22
| December 21, 1994
| Chicago
| W 107–99
|
|
|
| Market Square Arena
| 15–7
|- align="center" bgcolor="#ffcccc"
| 23
| December 23, 1994
| @ Chicago
| L 92–116
|
|
|
| United Center
| 15–8
|- align="center" bgcolor="#ccffcc"
| 24
| December 27, 1994
| @ Denver
| W 95–91
|
|
|
| McNichols Sports Arena
| 16–8
|- align="center" bgcolor="#ffcccc"
| 25
| December 28, 1994
| @ Utah
| L 95–117
|
|
|
| Delta Center
| 16–9
|- align="center" bgcolor="#ccffcc"
| 26
| December 30, 1994
| New Jersey
| W 96–79
|
|
|
| Market Square Arena
| 17–9

|- align="center" bgcolor="#ffcccc"
| 27
| January 3, 1995
| @ New Jersey
| L 103–114
|
|
|
| Brendan Byrne Arena
| 17–10
|- align="center" bgcolor="#ccffcc"
| 28
| January 4, 1995
| Washington
| W 94–90
|
|
|
| Market Square Arena
| 18–10
|- align="center" bgcolor="#ffcccc"
| 29
| January 6, 1995
| @ Dallas
| L 92–103
|
|
|
| Reunion Arena
| 18–11
|- align="center" bgcolor="#ccffcc"
| 30
| January 7, 19958:30p.m. EST
| @ Houston
| W 88–83
| Miller (23)
| D. Davis (12)
| Jackson (8)
| The Summit16,611
| 19–11
|- align="center" bgcolor="#ffcccc"
| 31
| January 10, 1995
| @ New York
| L 105–117
|
|
|
| Madison Square Garden
| 19–12
|- align="center" bgcolor="#ffcccc"
| 32
| January 11, 1995
| @ Boston
| L 97–100
|
|
|
| Boston Garden
| 19–13
|- align="center" bgcolor="#ccffcc"
| 33
| January 13, 1995
| @ Washington
| W 113–99
|
|
|
| Capital Centre
| 20–13
|- align="center" bgcolor="#ffcccc"
| 34
| January 14, 1995
| Milwaukee
| L 95–97
|
|
|
| Market Square Arena
| 20–14
|- align="center" bgcolor="#ffcccc"
| 35
| January 16, 1995
| Utah
| L 98–99 (OT)
|
|
|
| Market Square Arena
| 21–14
|- align="center" bgcolor="#ccffcc"
| 36
| January 18, 1995
| L.A. Lakers
| W 106–105
|
|
|
| Market Square Arena
| 21–15
|- align="center" bgcolor="#ccffcc"
| 37
| January 20, 1995
| Atlanta
| W 99–89
|
|
|
| Market Square Arena
| 22–15
|- align="center" bgcolor="#ccffcc"
| 38
| January 22, 19952:30p.m. EST
| San Antonio
| W 98–93
| Smits (16)
| D. Davis (11)
| Jackson (7)
| Market Square Arena16,672
| 23–15
|- align="center" bgcolor="#ffcccc"
| 39
| January 24, 1995
| @ Miami
| L 96–107
|
|
|
| Miami Arena
| 23–16
|- align="center" bgcolor="#ffcccc"
| 40
| January 26, 1995
| Phoenix
| L 86–92
|
|
|
| Market Square Arena
| 23–17
|- align="center" bgcolor="#ccffcc"
| 41
| January 28, 1995
| Philadelphia
| W 106–103 (OT)
|
|
|
| Market Square Arena
| 24–17

|- align="center" bgcolor="#ccffcc"
| 42
| February 1, 1995
| Cleveland
| W 101–82
|
|
|
| Market Square Arena
| 25–17
|- align="center" bgcolor="#ccffcc"
| 43
| February 3, 19957:30p.m. EST
| Orlando
| W 118–106
| Smits (27)
| Smits (10)
| Miller (5)
| Market Square Arena16,749
| 26–17
|- align="center" bgcolor="#ffcccc"
| 44
| February 4, 1995
| @ Cleveland
| L 73–82
|
|
|
| Gund Arena
| 26–18
|- align="center" bgcolor="#ccffcc"
| 45
| February 7, 1995
| @ Charlotte
| W 95–92 (OT)
|
|
|
| Charlotte Coliseum
| 27–18
|- align="center" bgcolor="#ffcccc"
| 46
| February 8, 1995
| New York
| L 77–96
|
|
|
| Market Square Arena
| 27–19
|- align="center"
|colspan="9" bgcolor="#bbcaff"|All-Star Break
|- style="background:#cfc;"
|- bgcolor="#bbffbb"
|- align="center" bgcolor="#ffcccc"
| 47
| February 14, 19957:30p.m. EST
| @ Orlando
| L 92–111
| Smits (20)
| Smits (8)
| Jackson (6)
| Orlando Arena16,010
| 27–20
|- align="center" bgcolor="#ccffcc"
| 48
| February 15, 1995
| Detroit
| W 114–88
|
|
|
| Market Square Arena
| 28–20
|- align="center" bgcolor="#ccffcc"
| 49
| February 17, 1995
| @ Minnesota
| W 110–78
|
|
|
| Target Center
| 29–20
|- align="center" bgcolor="#ccffcc"
| 50
| February 19, 1995
| Miami
| W 106–87
|
|
|
| Market Square Arena
| 30–20
|- align="center" bgcolor="#ccffcc"
| 51
| February 22, 1995
| @ New Jersey
| W 113–94
|
|
|
| Brendan Byrne Arena
| 31–20
|- align="center" bgcolor="#ccffcc"
| 52
| February 24, 1995
| @ Milwaukee
| W 98–86
|
|
|
| Bradley Center
| 32–20
|- align="center" bgcolor="#ccffcc"
| 53
| February 26, 1995
| Dallas
| W 100–92
|
|
|
| Market Square Arena
| 33–20
|- align="center" bgcolor="#ccffcc"
| 54
| February 27, 1995
| @ Boston
| W 108–97
|
|
|
| Boston Garden
| 34–20

|- align="center" bgcolor="#ffcccc"
| 55
| March 1, 1995
| @ Detroit
| L 79–92
|
|
|
| The Palace of Auburn Hills
| 34–21
|- align="center" bgcolor="#ffcccc"
| 56
| March 3, 1995
| @ Washington
| L 106–111
|
|
|
| Capital Centre
| 34–22
|- align="center" bgcolor="#ffcccc"
| 57
| March 4, 1995
| Boston
| L 101–107
|
|
|
| Market Square Arena
| 34–23
|- align="center" bgcolor="#ccffcc"
| 58
| March 7, 19958:30p.m. EST
| @ San Antonio
| W 117–100
| Smits (35)
| Smits (10)
| Jackson (6)
| Alamodome17,665
| 35–23
|- align="center" bgcolor="#ccffcc"
| 59
| March 9, 1995
| @ Sacramento
| W 109–94
|
|
|
| ARCO Arena
| 36–23
|- align="center" bgcolor="#ccffcc"
| 60
| March 10, 1995
| @ Phoenix
| W 112–97
|
|
|
| America West Arena
| 37–23
|- align="center" bgcolor="#ffcccc"
| 61
| March 13, 1995
| @ L.A. Lakers
| L 91–93
|
|
|
| Great Western Forum
| 37–24
|- align="center" bgcolor="#ccffcc"
| 62
| March 15, 1995
| Milwaukee
| W 117–108
|
|
|
| Market Square Arena
| 38–24
|- align="center" bgcolor="#ccffcc"
| 63
| March 17, 19957:30p.m. EST
| Orlando
| W 107–97
| Smits (21)
| Smits (11)
| Jackson (11)
| Market Square Arena16,706
| 39–24
|- align="center" bgcolor="#ccffcc"
| 64
| March 19, 1995
| Chicago
| W 103–96 (OT)
|
|
|
| Market Square Arena
| 40–24
|- align="center" bgcolor="#ffcccc"
| 65
| March 21, 1995
| @ Miami
| L 95–97
|
|
|
| Miami Arena
| 40–25
|- align="center" bgcolor="#ccffcc"
| 66
| March 22, 1995
| L.A. Clippers
| W 107–103
|
|
|
| Market Square Arena
| 41–25
|- align="center" bgcolor="#ccffcc"
| 67
| March 24, 1995
| Sacramento
| W 103–96
|
|
|
| Market Square Arena
| 42–25
|- align="center" bgcolor="#ccffcc"
| 68
| March 25, 1995
| @ Philadelphia
| W 84–75
|
|
|
| CoreStates Spectrum
| 43–25
|- align="center" bgcolor="#ccffcc"
| 69
| March 27, 1995
| New Jersey
| W 98–87
|
|
|
| Market Square Arena
| 44–25
|- align="center" bgcolor="#ccffcc"
| 70
| March 29, 1995
| Cleveland
| W 107–96
|
|
|
| Market Square Arena
| 45–25
|- align="center" bgcolor="#ffcccc"
| 71
| March 31, 1995
| Denver
| L 92–107
|
|
|
| Market Square Arena
| 45–26

|- align="center" bgcolor="#ccffcc"
| 72
| April 2, 1995
| Portland
| W 104–93
|
|
|
| Market Square Arena
| 46–26
|- align="center" bgcolor="#ccffcc"
| 73
| April 4, 1995
| @ New York
| W 94–90
|
|
|
| Madison Square Garden
| 47–26
|- align="center" bgcolor="#ccffcc"
| 74
| April 5, 1995
| Washington
| W 102–90
|
|
|
| Market Square Arena
| 48–26
|- align="center" bgcolor="#ffcccc"
| 75
| April 7, 1995
| @ Atlanta
| L 90–102
|
|
|
| The Omni
| 48–27
|- align="center" bgcolor="#ccffcc"
| 76
| April 9, 1995
| Charlotte
| W 97–68
|
|
|
| Market Square Arena
| 49–27
|- align="center" bgcolor="#ffcccc"
| 77
| April 11, 1995
| @ Chicago
| L 89–96
|
|
|
| United Center
| 49–28
|- align="center" bgcolor="#ffcccc"
| 78
| April 14, 1995
| New York
| L 84–88
|
|
|
| Market Square Arena
| 49–29
|- align="center" bgcolor="#ccffcc"
| 79
| April 16, 1995
| Minnesota
| W 114–75
|
|
|
| Market Square Arena
| 50–29
|- align="center" bgcolor="#ccffcc"
| 80
| April 19, 1995
| Philadelphia
| W 103–91
|
|
|
| Market Square Arena
| 51–29
|- align="center" bgcolor="#ffcccc"
| 81
| April 21, 19957:00p.m. EST
| @ Orlando
| L 86–110
| Miller (14)
| D. Davis, Mitchell (9)
| Jackson (8)
| Orlando Arena16,010
| 51–30
|- align="center" bgcolor="#ccffcc"
| 82
| April 23, 1995
| Atlanta
| W 103–87
|
|
|
| Market Square Arena
| 52–30

Playoffs

|- align="center" bgcolor="#ccffcc"
| 1
| April 27, 1995
| Atlanta
| W 90–82
| Miller (24)
| McKey (9)
| Jackson (9)
| Market Square Arena16,445
| 1–0
|- align="center" bgcolor="#ccffcc"
| 2
| April 29, 1995
| Atlanta
| W 105–97
| Miller (39)
| Smits (11)
| Jackson (7)
| Market Square Arena16,692
| 2–0
|- align="center" bgcolor="#ccffcc"
| 3
| May 2, 1995
| @ Atlanta
| W 105–89
| Miller (32)
| Smits (14)
| Jackson (7)
| The Omni12,106
| 3–0
|-

|- align="center" bgcolor="#ccffcc"
| 1
| May 7, 1995
| @ New York
| W 107–105
| Smits (34)
| D. Davis (13)
| Jackson (7)
| Madison Square Garden19,763
| 1–0
|- align="center" bgcolor="#ffcccc"
| 2
| May 9, 1995
| @ New York
| L 77–96
| D. Davis (13)
| D. Davis (9)
| Jackson,Workman (4)
| Madison Square Garden19,763
| 1–1
|- align="center" bgcolor="#ccffcc"
| 3
| May 11, 1995
| New York
| W 97–95 (OT)
| Miller (26)
| Miller (11)
| Jackson (4)
| Market Square Arena16,675
| 2–1
|- align="center" bgcolor="#ccffcc"
| 4
| May 13, 1995
| New York
| W 98–84
| Smits (25)
| Smits (11)
| Jackson (11)
| Market Square Arena16,678
| 3–1
|- align="center" bgcolor="#ffcccc"
| 5
| May 17, 1995
| @ New York
| L 95–96
| Smits (28)
| A. Davis (9)
| Miller (6)
| Madison Square Garden19,763
| 3–2
|- align="center" bgcolor="#ffcccc"
| 6
| May 19, 1995
| New York
| L 82–92
| Smits (21)
| A. Davis (8)
| McKey (6)
| Market Square Arena16,679
| 3–3
|- align="center" bgcolor="#ccffcc"
| 7
| May 21, 1995
| @ New York
| W 97–95
| Miller (29)
| Jackson (8)
| Jackson (8)
| Madison Square Garden19,763
| 4–3
|-

|- align="center" bgcolor="#ffcccc"
| 1
| May 23, 19957:00p.m. EST
| @ Orlando
| L 101–105
| Miller (26)
| D. Davis (8)
| Jackson (7)
| Orlando Arena16,010
| 0–1
|- align="center" bgcolor="#ffcccc"
| 2
| May 25, 19957:00p.m. EST
| @ Orlando
| L 114–119
| Miller (37)
| D. Davis (13)
| Smits (6)
| Orlando Arena16,010
| 0–2
|- align="center" bgcolor="#ccffcc"
| 3
| May 27, 19952:30p.m. EST
| Orlando
| W 105–100
| Miller (26)
| A. Davis (10)
| Jackson (13)
| Market Square Arena16,477
| 1–2
|- align="center" bgcolor="#ccffcc"
| 4
| May 29, 19952:30p.m. EST
| Orlando
| W 94–93
| Miller (23)
| Jackson, Smits (7)
| Smits (7)
| Market Square Arena16,477
| 2–2
|- align="center" bgcolor="#ffcccc"
| 5
| May 31, 19958:00p.m. EST
| @ Orlando
| L 106–108
| Miller, McKey (21)
| McKey (9)
| Jackson (11)
| Orlando Arena16,010
| 2–3
|- align="center" bgcolor="#ccffcc"
| 6
| June 2, 19958:00p.m. EST
| Orlando
| W 123–96
| Reggie Miller (36)
| Smits, D. Davis (10)
| Mark Jackson (12)
| Market Square Arena16,477
| 3–3
|- align="center" bgcolor="#ffcccc"
| 7
| June 4, 19956:00p.m. EST
| @ Orlando
| L 81–105
| D. Davis (15)
| D. Davis (14)
| Jackson (5)
| Orlando Arena16,010
| 3–4
|-

Player Statistics

Season

Playoffs

Player Statistics Citation:

Awards, records, and honors
 Reggie Miller, NBA All-Star Game
 Reggie Miller, All-NBA Third Team
 Derrick McKey, NBA All-Defensive Second Team

Transactions
The Pacers were involved in the following transactions during the 1994–95 season.

Trades

Free agents

Additions

Subtractions

Player Transactions Citation:

References

  Pacers on Basketball Reference

Indiana Pacers seasons
Pace
Pace
Indiana